Stefan Schiller (1857—1933) was a Polish architect, eclectic representative, academician of the Imperial Academy of Arts.

Biography
Graduate of the Imperial Academy of Arts (1881). During his studies he received awards from the Academy of Arts: a small silver medal (1878), a large silver medal (1879), a small gold medal (1880) for the program “Project of the City Council”, a large gold medal (1881) for the program “Project of the district court in the capital. " Cool artist 1st degree. The title of academician (1888). The main works made in the Renaissance and Baroque style are in the Polish capital.

Moved to Warsaw (1888). In Warsaw and its surroundings, Schiller created about 700 Renaissance and Baroque buildings and restored many historical buildings. Schiller was the chief editor of an architectural magazine and architect of the city of Warsaw.

Books
 Do we have Polish architecture? (1916)
 The tradition of folk architecture in Polish architecture (1917).

Works

References

Literature
 

1857 births
1933 deaths
19th-century Polish architects
20th-century Polish architects
Architects from Warsaw